Li Ning (born March 10, 1963 in Liuzhou, Guangxi) is a Chinese retired gymnast, billionaire entrepreneur, and the founder of the eponymous sportswear company Li-Ning.

Gymnastics career 
Li started training at the age of eight and was selected into the national team in 1980. In 1982, he won six of the seven medals awarded at the Sixth World Cup Gymnastic Competition, earning him the title "Prince of Gymnastics".

Li is most famous for winning six medals at the 1984 Summer Olympics, which was the first Olympics in which the People's Republic of China participated. He won three gold medals (in floor exercise, pommel horse, and rings), two silver medals, and one bronze medal. Li became the most decorated Chinese athlete at the first Olympics that China participated in after the founding of the People's Republic in October 1949.

Li won 11 World Artistic Gymnastics Championships medals, including gold medals in the rings (1985) and team all-around (1983).

Li took part in his second 1988 Olympics in Seoul despite carrying injuries. It was an end to an illustrious gymnastic career, as he was off-form. He did not win any medals that year.

Post-gymnastics 

Li retired from sporting competition in 1988, and in 1990 he founded Li-Ning Company Limited, which sells footwear and sporting apparel in China. Li remains chairman of the company's board of directors. According to Hurun Report's China Rich List 2014, he has an estimated fortune of RMB 5 billion, making him the 407th wealthiest person in China.

Li was inducted into the International Gymnastics Hall of Fame in 2000, becoming the first Chinese inductee.

In 2017, a statue was erected in his honor on the shores of Lake Geneva in Montreux.

At the 2008 Summer Olympics, Li Ning ignited the cauldron at the opening ceremony after being hoisted high into the air with cables and miming running around the rim of the stadium.

Personal life 
Li is married to Chen Yongyan, a fellow gymnast who won an Olympic bronze in 1984.

See also 

List of multiple Olympic medalists at a single Games

References

External links 

 List of competitive results at Gymn Forum
 Li Ning: China's legendary gymnast has combined sporting agility with commercial muscle, 60 Years of Asian Heroes, By Hannah Beech, Time, 2006
 

1963 births
Living people
Asian Games gold medalists for China
Asian Games medalists in gymnastics
Asian Games silver medalists for China
Chinese male artistic gymnasts
Businesspeople from Guangxi
Gymnasts at the 1982 Asian Games
Gymnasts at the 1984 Summer Olympics
Gymnasts at the 1986 Asian Games
Gymnasts at the 1988 Summer Olympics
Gymnasts from Guangxi
Medalists at the 1982 Asian Games
Medalists at the 1984 Summer Olympics
Medalists at the 1986 Asian Games
Medalists at the World Artistic Gymnastics Championships
Olympic cauldron lighters
Olympic gold medalists for China
Olympic gymnasts of China
Olympic bronze medalists for China
Olympic silver medalists for China
Olympic medalists in gymnastics
Peking University alumni
People from Liuzhou
Universiade gold medalists for China
Universiade medalists in gymnastics
World champion gymnasts
Zhuang people
Medalists at the 1981 Summer Universiade